The Apostolic Nunciature to United Arab Emirates is an ecclesiastical office of the Catholic Church in United Arab Emirates. It is a diplomatic post of the Holy See, whose representative is called the Apostolic Nuncio with the rank of an ambassador. The Apostolic Nuncio to United Arab Emirates was also the Apostolic Nuncio to Kuwait and resided in Kuwait City until 2022. 

Before the Holy See and United Arab Emirates established diplomatic relations, the Holy See represented its interests in United Arab Emirates through delegations with regional responsibilities, first the Apostolic Delegation to the Red Sea Region established by Pope Paul VI on 3 July 1969, and then the Apostolic Delegation to the Arabian Peninsula established by Pope John Paul II on 26 March 1992. The Holy See and United Arab Emirates established diplomatic relations on 31 May 2007.

The offices of the nunciature in Abu Dhabi were opened by Archbishop Edgar Peña Parra on behalf of the Holy See on 4 February 2022. On 03 January 2023, Pope Francis appointed Christophe Zakhia El-Kassis, Titular Archbishop of Roselle, as the first nuncio who will reside in the Nunciature in Abu Dhabi.

Apostolic Nuncios to United Arab Emirates 
Paul-Mounged El-Hachem (04 August 2007 – 02 December 2009)
Petar Rajič (27 March 2010 – 15 June 2015)
Francisco Montecillo Padilla (26 April 2016 – 17 April 2020)
Christophe Zakhia El-Kassis (3 January 2023 - present)

See also 

 Apostolic Vicariate of Southern Arabia

References

United Arab Emirates
 
Catholic Church in the United Arab Emirates
Apostolic Vicariate of Southern Arabia
Catholic Church in the Middle East